Boe is a district in the country of Nauru. It is the only district of Boe Constituency.

History
On September 5, 2019, the Pacific Light House Church (Born Again Christian Church) was opened in the district.

Geography
Boe is located in the southwest of the island. It borders on the districts of Aiwo, Yaren along the coastline, and Buada inland.

It covers an area of 0.5 km², and has a population of 950. It is the smallest and most densely populated district in Nauru. The elevation above sea level is about 5 metres.

Education

Boe Infant School is in Boe. The primary and secondary schools serving all of Nauru are Yaren Primary School in Yaren District (years 1-3), Nauru Primary School in Meneng District (years 4-6), Nauru College in Denigomodu District (years 7-9), and Nauru Secondary School (years 10-12) in Yaren District.

Notable people
Baron D. Waqa, the former President of Nauru, is from Boe, having been elected from that constituency to serve in the Parliament of Nauru.
Kinza Clodumar, formerly President of Nauru, is from Boe.
A native from Boe is the second Angam Baby Bethel Enproe Adam.

See also
 Geography of Nauru
 List of settlements in Nauru

References

External links

Districts of Nauru
Populated places in Nauru